Franz Ackermann (born 1963 in Neumarkt-Sankt Veit, Bavaria) is a German painter and installation artist based in Berlin. He makes cartoonish abstraction.

Life

He attended the Akademie der Bildenden Kunste in Munich from 1984 to 1988 and the Hochschule für bildende Künste Hamburg from 1989 to 1991.

He has shown work internationally in many exhibitions including the 2003 Venice Biennale, "Drawing Now: 8 Propositions" at the Museum of Modern Art in New York City, "Hybrids" at Tate Liverpool, "Global Navigation System" at Pace le aloghy de Tokyo in Paris and "Seasons in the Sun" at the Stedelijk Museum in Amsterdam.  He is represented by neugerriemschneider in Berlin, Gavin Brown's Enterprise in New York, Meyer Riegger gallery in Karlsruhe, Galeria Fortes Vilaca in Sao Paulo and Gio Marconi in Milan.

His works are held in the collection of the Museum of Modern Art, in New York.

See also
 List of German painters

References

External links 
Franz Ackermann Mai 36 Gallery
Franz Ackermann White Cube Artists
Artforum, April, 2001.
  Franz Ackermann

1963 births
Living people
People from Mühldorf (district)
20th-century German painters
20th-century German male artists
German male painters
21st-century German painters
21st-century German male artists
Academy of Fine Arts, Munich alumni
German contemporary artists